Confessions from a Holiday Camp is a 1977 British comedy film. It is the last film in the series which began with Confessions of a Window Cleaner. The film was released in North America in 1978 under the title Confessions of a Summer Camp Counsellor.

Plot
Timmy Lea and his brother-in-law Sidney Noggett are working as entertainment officers at Funfrall, a typical British holiday camp. The staff are lazy and inefficient, preferring to laze by the pool rather than organise activities for the holiday campers. A new owner, Mr. Whitemonk, an  ex-prison officer, takes over the camp and is determined to install discipline into the staff. He is on the verge of dismissing Timmy and Sidney; however, Sidney's suggestion of organising a beauty contest changes his mind.

Producer Michael Klinger was not happy with the script, noting a number of problems that he felt detracted from the quality that set the series apart from its imitators.

Cast
Cast overview, first billed only:

Robin Askwith ....  Timmy Lea 
Antony Booth ....  Sidney Noggett 
Bill Maynard ....  Mr. Lea 
Doris Hare ....  Mrs. Lea 
Sheila White ....  Rosie Noggett 
Linda Hayden ....  Brigitte 
Lance Percival ....  Lionel 
John Junkin ....  Mr. Whitemonk 
Liz Fraser ....  Mrs. Antonia Whitemonk 
Colin Crompton ....  Roughage 
Nicola Blackman ....  Blackbird 
Nicholas Bond-Owen ....  Kevin (as Nicholas Owen) 
Caroline Ellis ....  Gladys
Sue Upton .... Renee
Penny Meredith ...  Married Woman 
Mike Savage ....  Kevin's Dad 
Janet Edis ....  Kevin's Mum 
 Deborah Brayshaw ...  Go Cart Girl 
 Kim Hardy ...  Announcer 
 David Auker ...  Alberto Smarmi 
 John Bryant ...  Young Man 
 Charlie Stewart ...  Piper 
 Carrie Jones ...  Bikini Girl 
 Julia Bond ...  Bikini Girl 
 Betty Hare ...  Mourner 
 Winifred Braemar ...  Mourner 
 Margo Field ...  Mrs. Dimwiddy 
 Marianne Stone ...  Waitress 
 Leonard Woodrow ...  Chaplain 
 Lauri Lupino Lane ...  Mayor 
 Ingrid Bower ...  Holiday Maker 
 Robert Booth ...  Holiday Maker 
 Michael Segal ...  Holiday Maker 
 Matt Kilroy ...  Chauffeur

Production

The holiday camp used in the film was Mill Rythe Holiday Village on Hayling Island in Hampshire.

The railway station scene was filmed at Radlett.

Soundtrack
The title track to the film was called Give Me England and was performed by scrumpy and western band, The Wurzels, arranged and conducted by Ed Welch and produced by Bob Barratt. It was released on 45 by EMI records Ltd (EMI 2677).
The Wurzels released an album of the same name in 1977, which featured the track along with its B-Side "Speedy Gonzales".

Further proposed films
Although Holiday Camp would turn out to be the last film in the series, a fifth and a sixth film, Confessions of a Plumber's Mate and Confessions of a Private Soldier, had been planned in 1977. Filming was set to begin on Plumber's Mate at the end of February 1978. Robin Askwith even expressed a desire to direct Private Soldier, but neither film materialised. In November 1977 the studio cancelled plans for future films. Columbia Pictures president David Begelman, who had been very supportive of the British film industry and who had green-lit the first Confessions film, had been implicated in a cheque-forging scandal and either quit or was fired. His successor had no interest in financing low-budget, profitable British films.

Producer Michael Klinger rejected a script based on Confessions from a Haunted House. Plans to shoot a made-for-video Confessions film in the 1980s also came to nothing, as did a proposed 1992 film, "Confessions of a Squaddie", which was proposed with action due to take place in post-Gulf War Kuwait.

References

Bibliography

External links
 
 
Confessions from a Holiday Camp BFI Film & TV Database

1977 films
1970s sex comedy films
British comedy films
Films shot at EMI-Elstree Studios
1970s English-language films
Films based on British novels
Films directed by Norman Cohen
British sex comedy films
Films with screenplays by Christopher Wood (writer)
1977 comedy films
1970s British films